Andrew Patterson may refer to:

Andrew Patterson (film director) (born 1982), American filmmaker
Andrew Patterson (cricketer) (born 1975), Irish cricketer
Andrew Patterson (architect) (born 1960), New Zealand architect
Andrew Patterson (Patterson), fictional academic, central character of British radio series Patterson
Andrew Patterson (Wisconsin politician) (1831–1893), Irish American farmer-politician in Wisconsin
Andy Patterson (born 1964), American racer
Pat Patterson (Negro league infielder) (Andrew Lawrence Patterson, 1911–1984), American baseball player

See also
Andrew Paterson (disambiguation)